Qavi Dalan (also Romanized as Qavī Dalan) is a village in Charuymaq-e Jonubesharqi Rural District, Shadian District, Charuymaq County, East Azerbaijan Province, Iran. At the 2006 census, its population was 95, in 13 families. Kala deh & Kefaf shahr are two main parts of Qavi Dalan.

References 

Populated places in Charuymaq County